Vénissieux (Arpitan:  or  in the Lyonnais dialect) is a commune in the Metropolis of Lyon in Auvergne-Rhône-Alpes region in eastern France.

Geography 
Vénissieux is located on the southern outskirts of Lyon.

Toponymy 
The name Vénissieux derives from Latin Viniciacum, itself crafted upon a Roman villa landlord named Vinicius. Inhabitants are called 'Vénissians'.

History 
Vénissieux was part of Nazi-occupied France during World War II. In May 1944, the Allies bombed the Nazi-held factories in the area, with a focus on Berliet factories. On 2 September 1944, Vénissieux was liberated by the Allies.

Riots in September 1981, occurring particularly in the Vénissieux neighborhood of Les Minguettes, were some of the first of their kind in suburban neighborhoods in France. In the summer of 1983, riots again occurred in Les Minguettes, attracting significant media attention, and marked the first time cars were burned as a protest in France. France was experiencing a wave of racist crimes, particularly perpetrated against African immigrants from the Maghreb, particularly the former colony of French Algeria (independent Algeria since 1962). On March 21, 1983, a police raid led to violent confrontation between a group of young people of Les Minguettes and the police. Demanding the end to police intimidation, a hunger strike began. On June 21, 1983, during a police raid, a police officer shot and seriously injured Toumi Djaïdja, the young president of the association SOS Avenir Minguettes. In response, the idea of a nonviolent march emerged in order to attempt to reduce tensions between the police and the youth of Les Minguettes. Priest Christian Delorme and pastor Jean Costil organized an extended, non-violent march, inspired by Reverend Martin Luther King Jr.'s demonstrations calling for the end of segregation in the United States and those of Mahatma Gandhi for Indian independence from the United Kingdom. They demanded equal rights, and an end to injustice and social inequality. The March for Equality and Against Racism grew into a series of events across France through the remainder of 1983.

Starting in the late 1980s, major urban renewal programs began transforming the Minguettes neighborhood, replacing old and crowded buildings and reducing high population density; between 1990 and 1999, the district's population declined by more than 2,000. Today Vénissieux is classified 'ZSP' for Priority Security Zone and still tarnished by a bad reputation because of its high crime rate. The district is home of about 22,000 inhabitants. Unemployment affects 40% of youth.

Transport
The city is situated between two boulevards. From south of the town the southern urban boulevard can be reached and from the north the Lyon ring road three exits that overlook the town can be joined : the exits of Parilly, Vénissieux center and the Moulin à Vent. The city is also very well served by the various means of transport by the TCL network. The last two, line D of the Lyon metro stations are located on its territory : Parc de Parilly and the railway station of Vénissieux, the Lyon's tramway T4 line and three bus lines. Vénissieux station has rail connections to Lyon and Saint-André-le-Gaz.

Population

The population data in the table and graph below refer to the commune of Vénissieux proper, in its geography at the given years. The commune of Vénissieux ceded the commune of Saint-Fons in 1888.

Immigration
In 2008, the immigrant population was 13,846, representing 24% of the population: 4.6% of the population were immigrants born in Europe and 19.4% born outside Europe, mainly originating from the Maghreb.

Culture
 Cinema Gérard-Philippe
 Music school Jean-Wiener
 Médiathèques Lucie-Aubrac, Robert-Desnos, Anatole-France, La Pyramide (neighborhood libraries)

Monuments
Some monuments are really old, like "l'ecole du centre" or "l'école Pasteur". This two monuments were used by the Nazi during the World War II.

Religion
 Evangelical, Protestant, Catholic churches
 Mosque Eyüb Sultan

The city offers a strong socio-educational project with nearly 60 institutions. It offers a favorable school education with a high density of schools throughout the city.

 There are regular confusion between the residents of Venissieux (Venissian, Venissianes) and with the city of Venice (Venetian).
 Vénissieux, a bit long to pronounce is often shortened to "Vé" in the current language residents ex: "Gare de Vé".

Notable people
Étienne Bally (1923–2018), athlete
Florence Foresti (born 1973), comedian and actress
Joseph-Désiré Job (born 1977), footballer
Samuel Dumoulin (born 1980), cyclist
Joris Jehan (born 1989), footballer 
Amel Majri (born 1993), footballer, lives here
Fares Ziam (born 1997), Mixed Martial Artist

Twin towns – sister cities

Vénissieux is twinned with:
 Manises, Spain
 Oschatz, Germany

See also
 Communes of the Metropolis of Lyon

References

External links

 Official website 

Communes of Lyon Metropolis
Dauphiné